Kasrilevka or Kasrilevke is a fictional shtetl introduced by a Yiddish author Sholem Aleichem. Located "exactly in the middle of
that blessed Pale", it is an idealized town of "little Jews" (die kleine mentsheleh), who met their misfortunes with humor and the ultimate belief in justice.  It has become an archetype shtetl. Other famous imaginary places of Sholem Aleichem are Yehupetz (for Kiev) and Boiberik (for Boyarka).

The name of the shtetl is derived from the Yiddish word kasril / kasrilik, an optimistic pauper, as Sholem Aleichem wrote: "However, there is still another name – kasril, or kasrilik. That name is spoken in a different tone altogether, almost a bragging tone. For instance, "Oh, am I ever a kasrilik!" A kasrilik is not just an ordinary pauper, a failure in life. On the contrary, he is a man who has not allowed poverty to degrade him. He laughs at it. He is poor, but cheerful." Dan Miron remarks that it is based on the Hebrew name Kasril or Katriel ( " God is my crown " or " God surrounds and supports me " ) 

The prototype of Kasrilevka was a Ukrainian town of Voronkov of the Russian Empire (now village , Ukraine), where Sholem Aleichem grew up.

The town continues the tradition of humorous Jewish towns, such as the fictional Chelm of the "Wise Men of Chelm" popularized by  Isaac Bashevis Singer and Kabtzansk  of Mendele Mocher Sforim.

A detailed glimpse at Voronko, the prototype of Kasrilevka, may be found in Funem Yarid: lebns-bashraybungen ("Back from the Fair: Descriptions of Life," 1915) - the unfinished Sholem Aleichem's autobiographical novel. Fumen Yarid describes not a real Voronkov, but something resembling Kasrilevka. Dan Miron makes a comparison of the real Voronkov from the memoir My Brother Sholom Aleichem of writer's brother Wolf Rabinovich , with its fictionalized image. 

Early Sholem Aleichem's feuilletons published in Dos Yidishe Folksblat in 1886-1887 anticipated Kasrilevke.

Stories involving Kasrilevka
Kasrilevke is the place for numerous author's novellas, short stories, sketches and plays and its description, rich in detail, was a considerable part of his work.
Dreyfus in Kasrilevke (1902)
A Yom Kippur Scandal
Motl, Peysi the Cantor's Son
The Town of the Little People
Kasrilevka was the title of the 1935 collection of Sholem Aleichem's stories printed in Yiddish in Moscow
"Der Zeyger" (1900; "The Clock That Struck Thirteen," 1900)
"Kasrilevker Tramvay," "Kasrilevker Hoteln," "Kasrilevker Restoranen," "Kasrilevker Vayn un Kasrilevker Shikirim," "Kasrilevker Teater," "Kasrilevker Sreyfes," and "Kasrilevker Banditn" ("Tram," "Hotels," "Restaurants," "Wine and Drunkards," "Theater," "Fires," "Bandits,") collected in English as A Guide to Kasrilevke, 1973)
"Ven Ikh Bin Roytshild" (1902; "If I Were Rothschild", 1979)
"Oysgetreyselt" (1902; "A Yom Kippur Scandal," 1979)Inside Kasrilevke translated by Isidore Goldstick (1948) includes:Dos Naye Kasrilevke (New Kasrilevka)Kasrilevke Nisrofim (The Burned-Out People of Kasrilevke)Kasrilevke Moshav Z'kenim (Home for the Aged in Kasreilevke)
Relatives of Tevye the Dairyman, including his wife Golde and their distant relative Menachem-Mendl hail from Kasrilevka, as hinted in the story "Eighteen from Pereshchepena".Tevye the Dairyman and The Railroad Stories, 2011,  "Eighteen from Pereshchepena", p. 24The Further Adventures of Menachem-Mendl: (New York—Warsaw—Vienna—Yehupetz)''

Notes

References

Fictional populated places in Russia
Shtetls
Sholem Aleichem